Mark Cory Rooney (born 1968) is an American record producer. He has written, produced, and developed various successful records for artists including Mariah Carey, Mary J. Blige, Jessica Simpson, Jennifer Lopez, Marc Anthony, Thalia, Michael Jackson, and Destiny's Child.

Life and career 
Rooney was raised in Jamaica, Queens, New York City, and at an early age he was exposed to the music industry by his parents, Herb Rooney and Brenda Reid of The Exciters, who toured with The Beatles in the early 1960s.  His father later branched out into production and was responsible for both the piano part and production on the Isley Brothers single, "It's Your Thing".  When the original members disbanded, his mother, Brenda Reid, brought her children into the band to continue the group. As a teenager he was later a member of a band called The Exciters.

In the 1990s Rooney and Prince Markie Dee of the Fat Boys released two solo albums by Prince Markie Dee including Billboards No. 1 Rap Single "Typical Reasons (Swing My Way)" (written by EMI writer/producer and Rooney's brother-in-law Hasan Johnson). Rooney and Prince Markie Dee formed the group Soul Convention together, when they were signed by Sony Music.  Rooney was approached by Sony to sign a solo artist deal but declined.  He went on to produce singles including "Real Love" and "Sweet Thing" by Mary J. Blige and "I'll Do 4 U" by Father MC at Uptown Records. Tommy Mottola signed him as a producer and eventually promoted him to vice president of A&R at Epic Records in 1994. Two years later, Rooney became VP of A&R at Crave Records.  Mottola subsequently named him Senior VP of Sony Music Entertainment in 1998.  Maintaining his position both as senior executive and producer at Sony, he was offered another executive position at Casablanca Records where he also wrote Lindsay Lohan's single, "Rumors".  He also produced the album and performed keyboards and provided background vocals. His albums have sold over 100 million copies and many of his albums have sold more than one million records.

He was executive producer on MTV's television series "The Shop" and VH1's series "Born to Diva".  "The Shop" is based out of Rooney's barber shop, Mr. Rooney's, in Jamaica, Queens, New York.  Artists including Busta Rhymes, Diddy, and Fabolous have appeared on the show for discussions on the music industry, their career, and to chat. VH1's "Born to Diva" featured Rooney as one of the panel judges, aside from his role as executive producer of the show.

Rooney formed his own company, Cory Rooney Group (CRG), which manages writers, producers, and two developing artists. The company focuses on music for television, fashion, and publishing.

Songwriting and production credits

References

External links 
songwriteruniverse.com page on Rooney

Songwriters from New York (state)
African-American songwriters
American hip hop record producers
American rhythm and blues musicians
Latin pop musicians
Latin Grammy Award winners
Living people
People from Jamaica, Queens
1968 births
Record producers from New York (state)
21st-century African-American people
20th-century African-American people